In probability theory, a random variable  is said to be mean independent of random variable  if and only if its conditional mean  equals its (unconditional) mean  for all  such that the probability density/mass of  at , , is not zero.

Stochastic independence implies mean independence, but the converse is not true.; moreover, mean independence implies uncorrelatedness while the converse is not true.

The concept of mean independence is often used in econometrics to have a middle ground between the strong assumption of independent random variables and the weak assumption of uncorrelated random variables

Further reading

References

Independence (probability theory)